Aliabad (also Romanized as ‘Alīābād; also known as ‘Alīābād-e Tal Bozān and Ali Abad Toobazan) is a village in Tolbozan Rural District, Golgir District, Masjed Soleyman County, Khuzestan Province, Iran. At the 2006 census, its population was 121, in 23 families.

References 

Populated places in Masjed Soleyman County